Kickboxer 3 (stylized on-screen as Kickboxer III: The Art of War) is a 1992 American martial arts film directed by Rick King. The film is the third in the Kickboxer film series with only Sasha Mitchell and Dennis Chan returning from the previous films. It was also the last film to feature Dennis Chan as Xian Chow.

Plot
The movie opens with a distressed woman being chased through a tropical forest by an unknown pursuer. It is soon revealed that the woman is attempting to escape from Frank Lane, an American running an illegal child sex ring operation in Brazil. Upon being recaptured, she is taken back to Lane's home and executed in front of the other slaves, as punishment for her actions.

Meanwhile, kickboxing champion David Sloan and his trainer Xian arrive in Rio de Janeiro for a championship bout. Though Xian is mostly interested in training for the upcoming fight, David dismisses the idea in favor of relaxing in the city. While eating lunch, their camera is suddenly stolen by a young thief, and David gives chase. After fending off a pair of drunken assailants, he catches up to the boy who then brandishes a knife, but David easily disarms him and takes back the camera. When the boy, Marcos, follows him back to the restaurant to reclaim the knife, Xian invites both him and his beautiful sister Isabella to join them for lunch, and they eventually become friends.

At a charity kickboxing event, David is asked to be the cornerman for another young fighter in an exhibition match against Eric Martine, an Argentine kickboxer managed by Lane, who also happens to be David's opponent for the upcoming championship fight. However, the aggressive Martine brutally beats the young fighter, prompting David to physically intervene on his behalf. As a result, David's bout with Martine is billed as a grudge match. Lane apologizes to David for Martine's actions and invites him to a party he is hosting.

David attends the party with Marcos and Isabella as his personal guests. Upon meeting her, Lane becomes infatuated with Isabella. When David parts ways with the children for the night, Lane secretly sends out a group of men to kidnap her. In a panic, Marcos asks for David's help. They file a police report, but with an overwhelming backlog of unsolved cases on their hands, the authorities do not consider their case a priority and advise them to simply forget about Isabella.

Undeterred, David and Xian launch their own investigation, which ultimately leads to their arrest. Lane bails them out in an attempt to cover his tracks, but the two continue their search. They purchase guns from an arms dealer and infiltrate a mansion owned by a pimp named Branco, eventually discovering that Lane is behind the child sex ring operation. They confront him in his home but are ambushed and taken prisoner. Lane forces David (with assistance from the henchman Pete) through a series of grueling exercises designed to weaken him before his match with Martine, such as hiking with a backpack full of rocks and water-skiing without skis. He then releases both men back to their hotel, with the condition that if David doesn't show up for the fight, Isabella will disappear forever. With Marcos' help, Xian is able to create and administer a cure for David's fatigue.

At the fight, David manages to defeat Martine, and Xian is successful in rescuing Isabella before Lane can flee the arena. Lane, who wagered his entire estate upon Martine's victory, is left bankrupt (and Pete the henchman dissociates Lane). Upon being reunited with Marcos, Isabella tells him about the other girls Lane has imprisoned, and David resolves to free them as well. In retaliation, Lane pulls a gun on David, but Marcos suddenly appears and stabs Lane in the stomach with his knife.

In the end, the police sergeant decides to cover up Lane's murder, and David arranges for Marcos and Isabella to attend school. Upon realizing that they have missed their flight back home, David, Xian, and the police sergeant decide to go out for drinks together.

Cast
 Sasha Mitchell as David Sloane
 Dennis Chan as Xian Chow, David's Muay Thai Kru
 Richard Comar as Frank Lane
 Noah Verduzco as Marcos
 Alethea Miranda as Isabella
 Ian Jacklin as Eric Martine
 Milton Goncalves as Sergeant
 Ricardo Petraglia as Alberto
 Gracindo Junior as Pete
 Miguel Oniga as Marcelo
 Lolo Souza Pinto as Margarida
 Renato Coutinho as Branco
 Kate Lyra as Branco's Wife
 Manitou Felipe as Machado
 Shuki Ron as Reinaldo
 Bernardo Jablonski as Father Bozano
 Fabio Junqueira as Brumado
 Nildo Parente as Vargas
 Angelo DeMatos as Doctor
 Sergio Jesus as Walter "Big Walter"
 Renata Roriz as Attractive Woman
 Charles Myara as Milton
 Frank Santos as Henrique
 Monique Lafond as Flavia
 Marco Ruas as Jealous Husband At Party

Production
In an interview with Sam Weisberg for the web site Hidden Films, director Rick King said working with Sasha Mitchell was extremely difficult, with frequent temper tantrums and even threats of violence: "I think he thought people thought he was stupid, which was true. And he was also violent, and so he used his position of privilege as the star in a very negative way".

Reception

Critical response
The film was not well received by critics.

References

External links

1992 films
1992 martial arts films
American martial arts films
Direct-to-video sequel films
Artisan Entertainment films
Films scored by Harry Manfredini
Films shot in Rio de Janeiro (city)
Kickboxing films
Kickboxer (film series)
American sequel films
1990s English-language films
Films directed by Rick King
1990s American films